Chagang Province (Chagangdo) is a province in North Korea; it is bordered by China's Jilin and Liaoning provinces to the north, Ryanggang and South Hamgyong to the east, South Pyongan to the south, and North Pyongan to the west.  Chagang was formed in 1949, after being demarcated from North Pyongan.  The provincial capital is Kanggye. Before 2019, Chagang was the only province of North Korea  completely inaccessible to tourists, possibly due to weapons factories and nuclear weapon facilities located there. In 2019 the city of Manpo became accessible to tourists. In May 2018, the province became a "Special Songun (military first) Revolutionary Zone" in relations to concealing the nuclear weapon and weapon's factories within the province.

Geography
Chagang Province is located in the northwestern part of Korea. It is a mountainous province; with the mountainous area amounting to 98 per cent of its total area. The mean height above sea level is 750 meters and the slope of most regions is 15 to 40 degrees.

The province has a distinct continental climate under the influence of the Asian continent. It has very cold and long winters, and brief springs and falls. The climate is characterized by great differences in daily and yearly temperature. In summer, downpours of rain and hail are frequent. Thus thunder and lightning occur frequently.

The province has great mineral wealth, and is North Korea's main source of lead, zinc, gold, copper, molybdenum, tungsten, antimony, graphite, apatite, alunite, limestone, calcium carbonate, anthracite and iron ores. There are also crystals and valuable gems there.

Main cities and economic activities
The province abounds in underground, forest and water resources. Before the Korean War, Chagang province was an isolated land with only two primitive mines, one timber mill and a distillery.

Nowadays, it has power, machine, chemical, light, mining and timber industries. Its total industrial output is 1000 times as much as just before the war.

The majority of North Korea's underground military industrial facilities are located in Chagang Province, including portions of their weapons of mass destruction program.

Kanggye is the capital city of Chagang Province. One of the main economic timber processing factories of the province, and the country, is located in Kanggye.

Huichon is the most developed city in the province, though. Its development dates back to the Korean War, when it became one of the cities of industrial relocation, as it was isolated and far from the main battlefields.

Nowadays, Huichon has several industries, such as a huge machine tool factory, silk mill and a hard glassware factory. In Huichon there is the main North Korean University of Telecommunications.

Chagang was one of the less developed and isolated provinces in North Korea after liberation in 1945. The terrain made farming difficult and only slash-and-burn farmers tilled mountain plots to eke out a living.

Nowadays, farming activities are mainly linked with livestock activities. One example is Hungju Farm.

Tourism in Chagang Province

The Chagang Province for a while was the only province in North Korea that tourists could not go to. The main reason believed to be why they were not allowed to was due to the province being home to weapons and nuclear weapon factories and sites. Prior to April 2019, the only part that was accessible for tourist in the Chagang Province was the Huichon Hotel.

However in April 2019, the province was opened to tourist in which they could go to the city of Manpo. The city is located right across the river from China.

Small and medium-size power stations
The province has been converted into a power base for the country, with the construction of Kanggye Youth Power Station, Unbong Power Station, Jangjagang Power Station and other large hydroelectric power stations.

The province has built since the 90s many small and medium-sized power stations, as a duty of the local authorities. Log-dam, water-course, raft and sluice were among the efficient methods practised in their construction.

Small hydraulic turbines, with a capacity of 2 kW to 70 kW, were developed by local technicians to dramatically increase the generating capacity.

Administrative divisions
Chagang is divided into 3 cities (si) and 15 counties (gun).

See also 

 Outline of North Korea

References

 행정 구역 현황 (Haengjeong Guyeok Hyeonhwang) (in Korean only)
 Administrative divisions of North Korea (in simplified Chinese; used as reference for Hanja)
 Panorama Korea, Foreign Language Publishing House, Pyongyang, 1999.

External links

The People's Korea: Chagang

 
Provinces of North Korea